Schwertner is an unincorporated community in Williamson County, Texas, United States. It is approximately 28 miles north-northeast of Round Rock, Texas.  Schwertner has a post office with the ZIP code 76573.  

Starting in 1909, Schwertner was along the tracks of the Bartlett-Florence Railway, later the Bartlett Western Railroad, which ran from a connection at Bartlett, Texas with the Missouri-Kansas-Texas Railroad to Florence, Texas, a significant cotton-processing center.   The railroad gave Apostle names to its stops, and the station for Schwertner was known as St. Matthew.  However, that line was abandoned in 1935.

References

External links
 

Unincorporated communities in Williamson County, Texas
Unincorporated communities in Texas
Greater Austin